Phillip Gregory Nesser  (December 10, 1880 - May 9, 1959) was a German-American professional American football player in the Ohio League and the early National Football League (NFL) for the Columbus Panhandles. He was also a member of the Nesser Brothers, a group consisting of seven brothers who made up the most famous football family in the United States from 1907 until the mid-1920s. He is distinguished as being the first German to play in the NFL.

Phil was primarily a tackle, although he often carried the ball on several plays.

Outside of football, Phil was considered a math genius although he never attended school past the fourth grade. According to his daughter, Phil later taught at Central High School in Columbus until the school's administrators found out he did not have a degree and forced him to resign. In addition to football, he was a champion hammer thrower.

References

A Colorful Game: Names are in the Book
Pro Football Reference Stats

1880 births
Players of American football from Columbus, Ohio
German players of American football
American football offensive linemen
Columbus Panhandles players
Columbus Panhandles (Ohio League) players
1959 deaths
Nesser family (American football)
German emigrants to the United States